Smaby is a surname. Notable people with the surname include:

Alpha Sunde Smaby (1910–1991), American politician and teacher
Matt Smaby (born 1984), American ice hockey player

See also
Maby